Soma Biswas (born 16 May 1978 in Ranaghat) is an athlete who lives in Kolkata, India and who specialises in the heptathlon. She rose to fame when she won the silver medal in 2002 Asian Games in Busan, South Korea. She won another silver medal at the 2006 Asian Games in Doha. She won the 110m hurdles, the 200m and the 800m during that heptathlon. Biswas worked with Kuntal Rai and several foreign coaches.

Awards 
She was one of the recipients of the prestigious Arjuna Award for Athletics (year 2003).

See also
 List of Indian women athletes

References

External links 
Soma Biswas at Athens
Profile at Doha 2006

1978 births
Living people
Indian heptathletes
Athletes (track and field) at the 2000 Summer Olympics
Athletes (track and field) at the 2004 Summer Olympics
Olympic athletes of India
Recipients of the Arjuna Award
Athletes from Kolkata
Sportswomen from West Bengal
Asian Games medalists in athletics (track and field)
Athletes (track and field) at the 2002 Asian Games
Athletes (track and field) at the 2006 Asian Games
20th-century Indian women
20th-century Indian people
21st-century Indian women
21st-century Indian people
Sportswomen from Kolkata
Asian Games gold medalists for India
Asian Games silver medalists for India
Medalists at the 2002 Asian Games
Medalists at the 2006 Asian Games